RW or rw may refer to:

In arts and entertainment
 The Real World (TV series), an American reality television show
 Road Wild, a World Championship Wrestling pay-per-view event
 Robbie Williams, a British pop star
 Robin Williams, an American actor
 Roger Waters, British musician
 Robot Wars (disambiguation)

In mathematics, science and technology

In computing
 Read-write access to files or directories, in file system permissions
 Read-write memory
 Rewritable media
 RenderWare, a 3-D rendering engine produced by Criterion Software

Other uses in mathematics, science, and technology
 Random walk, a mathematical process that can be used to explain phenomena in several disciplines
 Reaction wheel, a type of flywheel used primarily by spacecraft for attitude control
 Robertson–Walker metric, in cosmology
 Robin Wight, botanist, noted as R.W.
 RW is the designation for the 15th variable star named in a constellation:
 RW Andromedae, a Mira variable located in the constellation Andromeda
 RW Cephei, an orange hypergiant located in the constellation Cepheus
 RW Cygni, a red supergiant located in the constellation Cygnus
 RW Ursae Minoris, a recurrent nova located in the constellation Ursa Minor
 Right of way may be referred to in civil engineering and drafting contexts as R/W or RW

Other uses
 Racewalking
 Real world, another term for reality in several contexts
 For other uses of "real world" see Real world (disambiguation)
 Respondent witness, in law
 Right-wing, one of the winger positions in sport
 Right-wing politics
 Rosewood, a type of wood used for guitar fingerboards
 Rukun warga, an administrative division of Indonesia
 Rwanda (ISO 3166-1 alpha-2 country code)
 .rw, country code top level domain (ccTLD) for Rwanda
 Kinyarwanda, a language in Rwanda (ISO 639 alpha-2 code)
 Republic Airlines (IATA airline designator)
 Royal Wings, a Jordanian airline